This is a list of breweries in Washington, D.C. and nearby in Virginia and Maryland.

List of breweries

Washington, D.C.
 3 Stars Brewing Company (Closed)
 Atlas Brew Works
 Bluejacket Brewery
 Bardo Brewing (Closed)
 Capitol City Brewing Company
 DC Brau Brewing
 Hellbender Brewing Company
 Mad Fox Taproom (Closed)
 The Public Option
 Red Bear Brewing Company
 Right Proper Brewing Company
 Christian Heurich Brewing Company (closed)
 Abner-Drury Brewery (closed)
 National Capital Brewing Company (closed)
 Schnell Brewery (closed)
 Juenemann Brewery (closed)
 Washington Brewery Company (closed)
 Metropolitan Lager Bier Brewery

Maryland
 7 Locks Brewing
 Astro Lab Brewing Company
 Brookeville Beer Farm
 Calvert Brewing Company
 Denizens Brewing Company
 Elder Pine Brewing Company
 Flying Dog Brewery
 Heavy Seas Beer
 Jailbreak Brewing Company
 True Respite Brewing Company

Virginia
 2 Silos Brewing Company
 Adroit Theory Brewing Company 
 Aslin Brewing Company
 Audacious Aleworks Brewery & Taproom
 BadWolf Brewing Company
 Beltway Brewing Company
 Caboose Commons
 Chubby Squirrel Brewing Company
 Corcoran Brewing Company
 The Craft of Brewing
 Crooked Run Brewing
 Dirt Farm Brewing
 Fair Winds
 Forge Brew Works
 Heritage Brewing Company
 Lost Rhino Brewing Company
 Mad Fox Brewing Company (Closed)
 Mustang Sally Brewing Company
 New District Brewing Company
 Ocelot Brewing Company
 Old Bust Head Brewing Company
 Old Ox Brewing Company
 Ono Brewing Company
 Port City Brewing Company
 Robert Portner Brewing Company
 Rocket Frog Brewing Company
 Sinistral Brewing Company
 Twinpanzee Brewing Co

See also
 List of breweries in the United States

References

External links
 Atlas Brew Works
 Capitol City Brewing Company
 DC Beer – Breweries
 Hellbender Brewing Company
 Right Proper Brewing Company
 Old Bust Head Brewing Company

 
Washington, D.C.
Washington, D.C.-related lists